Technical and Industrial Cultural Heritage in Norway encompasses discontinued industrial and other facilities with great historical and architectural value. It is one of the ten conservation programs for the Norwegian Directorate for Cultural Heritage, which seeks to refurbish and preserve a representative range of facilities linked to Norway's most important industrial routes, which has had a significant impact on local business history.

Directorate for Cultural Heritage priority list
The Norwegian Directorate for Cultural Heritage list of priority technical and industrial cultural heritage comprises 15 facilities:

Atlungstad Distillery
Bredalsholmen Shipyards
Bratteklev Shipyard
Fetsund Booms
Folldal Mines
Halden Canal
Kistefos Wood Pulp Mill
Klevfos Cellulose and Paper Factory
Neptune Herring Oil Factory
Næs Ironworks
Odda Smelting Plant
Rjukan Line
Salhus Knitting Mill
Sjølingstad Woolen Mill
Spillum Sawmill and Planing
Tyssedal Hydroelectric Power Station

References

External links
 Protection Program for Technical and Industrial Cultural Heritage at the Norwegian Directorate for Cultural Heritage website
 Technical and Industrial Cultural Heritage at the Norwegian Environment Agency website

Cultural heritage of Norway
History of technology